LaCrosse School is a public high school in LaCrosse, Indiana and is part of the Tri-Township Consolidated School Corporation.

About
The current building was completed in 1915 and the gymnasium was added in 1950.  It serves high school students from 3 townships (Dewey, Cass, & Prairie) in the southern part of LaPorte County.

Demographics

The Demographic breakdown of the 107 students as of the 2015-2016 school year was as follows:
 Male - 51.4%  
 Female - 48.6% 
 Hispanic - 4.7%
 White - 95.3%

32.7% of the students were eligible for free or reduced-cost lunch. In 2015-2016, LaCrosse was a Title I school.

Academics

Performance ratings

In 2013, the Indiana Department of Education recognized LaCrosse High School as a 4-star school, the only high school in LaPorte County to do so. Additionally, the school has received an "A" rating by INDOE since 2012.

Testing

In 2011, LaCrosse High School students passed the ECA in English 10 with a 90% passing rate and Algebra I with an 86% passing rate.

Extracurricular activities

Available at LaCrosse High School are: National Honor Society, Student Council, Drama Club, Spanish Club, Friends of Rachel, Yearbook Club, Spell Bowl, Academic Super Bowl, and Girls' Book Group.

See also
 List of high schools in Indiana

References

External links
 Indiana Department of Education: School Snapshot
 LaCrosse High School Website
 IHSAA Website

Public high schools in Indiana
Educational institutions established in 1890
Schools in LaPorte County, Indiana
1890 establishments in Indiana